Hibakusha ( or ;  or ;  "person affected by a bomb" or "person affected by exposure [to radioactivity]") is a word of Japanese origin generally designating the people affected by the atomic bombings of Hiroshima and Nagasaki at the end of World War II.

Definition
The word hibakusha is Japanese, originally written in kanji. While the term Hibakusha  (hi  "affected" + baku  "bomb" + sha  "person") has been used before in Japanese to designate any victim of bombs, its worldwide democratisation led to a definition concerning the survivors of the atomic bombs dropped in Japan by the United States Army Air Forces on the 6 and 9 August 1945.

Anti-nuclear movements and associations, among others of hibakusha, spread the term to designate any direct victim of nuclear disaster, including the ones of the nuclear plant in Fukushima. They therefore prefer the writing  (substituting baku  "bomb" with the homophonous  "exposition") or "person affected by the exposition", implying "person affected by nuclear exposure". This definition tends to be adopted since 2011.

The juridic status of hibakusha is allocated to certain people, mainly by the Japanese government.

Official recognition
The Atomic Bomb Survivors Relief Law defines hibakusha as people who fall into one or more of the following categories: within a few kilometers of the hypocenters of the bombs; within 2 km of the hypocenters within two weeks of the bombings; exposed to radiation from fallout; or not yet born but carried by pregnant women in any of these categories. The Japanese government has recognized about 650,000 people as hibakusha. , 118,935 were still alive, mostly in Japan. The government of Japan recognizes about 1% of these as having illnesses caused by radiation. Hibakusha are entitled to government support. They receive a certain amount of allowance per month, and the ones certified as suffering from bomb-related diseases receive a special medical allowance.

The memorials in Hiroshima and Nagasaki contain lists of the names of the hibakusha who are known to have died since the bombings. Updated annually on the anniversaries of the bombings, the memorials record the names of 526,000 hibakusha; 333,907 in Hiroshima and 192,310 in Nagasaki.

In 1957, the Japanese Parliament passed a law providing for free medical care for hibakusha. During the 1970s, non-Japanese hibakusha who suffered from those atomic attacks began to demand the right for free medical care and the right to stay in Japan for that purpose. In 1978, the Japanese Supreme Court ruled that such persons were entitled to free medical care while staying in Japan.

Korean survivors
During the war, many Korean people were forced to go to both Hiroshima and Nagasaki to work by Japanese imperialists. According to recent estimates, about 20,000 Koreans were killed in Hiroshima and about 2,000 died in Nagasaki. It is estimated that one in seven of the Hiroshima victims was of Korean ancestry. For many years, Koreans had a difficult time fighting for recognition as atomic bomb victims and were denied health benefits. However, most issues have been addressed in recent years through lawsuits.

Japanese-American survivors

It was a common practice before the war for American Issei, or first-generation immigrants, to send their children on extended trips to Japan to study or visit relatives. More Japanese immigrated to the U.S. from Hiroshima than from any other prefecture, and Nagasaki also sent a high number of immigrants to Hawai'i and the mainland. There was, therefore, a sizable population of American-born Nisei and Kibei living in their parents' hometowns of Hiroshima and Nagasaki at the time of the atomic bombings. The actual number of Japanese Americans affected by the bombings is unknown – although estimates put approximately 11,000 in Hiroshima city alone – but some 3,000 of them are known to have survived and returned to the U.S. after the war.

A second group of hibakusha counted among Japanese American survivors are those who came to the U.S. in a later wave of Japanese immigration during the 1950s and 1960s. Most in this group were born in Japan and migrated to the U.S. in search of educational and work opportunities that were scarce in post-war Japan. Many were "war brides", or Japanese women who had married American men related to the U.S. military's occupation of Japan.

As of 2014, there are about 1,000 recorded Japanese American hibakusha living in the United States. They receive monetary support from the Japanese government and biannual medical checkups with Hiroshima and Nagasaki doctors familiar with the particular concerns of atomic bomb survivors. The U.S. government provides no support to Japanese American hibakusha.

Other foreign survivors
While one British Commonwealth citizen
and seven Dutch POWs (two names known) died in the Nagasaki bombing, at least two POWs reportedly died postwar from cancer thought to have been caused by the atomic bomb.
One American POW, Joe Kieyoomia, was a Navajo in Nagasaki at the time of the bombing but survived, reportedly having been shielded from the effects of the bomb by the concrete walls of his cell.

Double survivors
People who suffered the effects of both bombings are known as nijū hibakusha in Japan. These people were in Hiroshima on August 6, 1945, and within two days managed to reach Nagasaki.

A documentary called Twice Bombed, Twice Survived: The Doubly Atomic Bombed of Hiroshima and Nagasaki was produced in 2006. The producers found 165 people who were victims of both bombings, and the production was screened at the United Nations.

On March 24, 2009, the Japanese government officially recognized Tsutomu Yamaguchi (1916–2010) as a double hibakusha. Tsutomu Yamaguchi was confirmed to be 3 kilometers from ground zero in Hiroshima on a business trip when the bomb was detonated. He was seriously burnt on his left side and spent the night in Hiroshima. He got back to his home city of Nagasaki on August 8, a day before the bomb in Nagasaki was dropped, and he was exposed to residual radiation while searching for his relatives. He was the first officially recognized survivor of both bombings. Tsutomu Yamaguchi died at the age of 93 on January 4, 2010, of stomach cancer.

Discrimination

Hibakusha and their children were (and still are) victims of severe discrimination when it comes to prospects of marriage or work due to public ignorance about the consequences of radiation sickness, with much of the public believing it to be hereditary or even contagious. This is despite the fact that no statistically demonstrable increase of birth defects/congenital malformations was found among the later conceived children born to survivors of the nuclear weapons used at Hiroshima and Nagasaki, or found in the later conceived children of cancer survivors who had previously received radiotherapy.
The surviving women of Hiroshima and Nagasaki, that could conceive, who were exposed to substantial amounts of radiation, went on and had children with no higher incidence of abnormalities/birth defects than the rate which is observed in the Japanese average.

Studs Terkel's book The Good War includes a conversation with two hibakusha. The postscript observes:

The  is a group formed by hibakusha in 1956 with the goals of pressuring the Japanese government to improve support of the victims and lobbying governments for the abolition of nuclear weapons.

Some estimates are that 140,000 people in Hiroshima (38.9% of the population) and 70,000 people in Nagasaki (28.0% of the population) died in 1945, but how many died immediately as a result of exposure to the blast, heat, or due to radiation, is unknown. One Atomic Bomb Casualty Commission (ABCC) report discusses 6,882 people examined in Hiroshima, and 6,621 people examined in Nagasaki, who were largely within 2000 meters from the hypocenter, who suffered injuries from the blast and heat but died from complications frequently compounded by acute radiation syndrome (ARS), all within about 20–30 days.

In the rare cases of survival for individuals who were in utero at the time of the bombing and yet who still were close enough to be exposed to less than or equal to 0.57 Gy, no difference in their cognitive abilities was found, suggesting a threshold dose for pregnancies below which there is no danger. In 50 or so children who survived the gestational process and were exposed to more than this dose, putting them within about 1000 meters from the hypocenter, microcephaly was observed; this is the only elevated birth defect issue observed in the Hibakusha, occurring in approximately 50 in-utero individuals who were situated less than 1000 meters from the bombings.

In a manner dependent on their distance from the hypocenter, in the 1987 Life Span Study, conducted by the Radiation Effects Research Foundation, a statistical excess of 507 cancers, of undefined lethality, were observed in 79,972 hibakusha who had still been living between 1958–1987 and who took part in the study.

An epidemiology study by the RERF estimates that from 1950 to 2000, 46% of leukemia deaths and 11% of solid cancers, of unspecified lethality, could be due to radiation from the bombs, with the statistical excess being estimated at 200 leukemia deaths and 1,700 solid cancers of undeclared lethality.

Health
 Effects of nuclear explosions on human health
 Radiation poisoning

Notable hibakusha

Hiroshima
 Hiroshima Maidens – 25 young women who had surgery in the US after the war
 Hubert Schiffer – Jesuit priest at Hiroshima
 Ikuo Hirayama – hibakusha of Hiroshima at 15 years old, painter
 Isao Harimoto – hibakusha of Hiroshima at 5 years old, ethnic Korean baseball professional player
 Issey Miyake – hibakusha of Hiroshima at 7 years old, clothing designer
 Julia Canny - Irish nun who survived Hiroshima and aided survivors
 Keiji Nakazawa –  hibakusha of Hiroshima at 6 years old, author of Barefoot Gen and other Anti-War Manga.
 Kiyoshi Tanimoto, hibakusha at 36 years old, Methodist minister, anti-nuclear activist, has helped Hiroshima Maidens and for hibakusha to gain social rights. Peace prize named after him
 Koko Kondo – hibakusha of Hiroshima at 1 year old, notable peace activist and daughter of Reverend Kiyoshi Tanimoto
 Masaru Kawasaki – hibakusha of Hiroshima at 19 years old, composer of the Dirge performed at every Hiroshima Peace Memorial Ceremony since 1975
 Michihiko Hachiya – hibakusha of Hiroshima at 42 years old, physician specialized in hibakusha, writer of Hiroshima Diary
 Sadako Kurihara – hibakusha of Hiroshima at 32 years old, poet, anti-nuclear activist, founder of Gensuikin Hiroshima Haha no Kai(« Mothers of Hiroshima »)
 Sadako Sasaki – hibakusha at 2 years old, well known for her goal to fold a thousand origami cranes in order to cure herself of leukemia and symbol of peace
 Sankichi Tōge – hibakusha at 28 years old, poet and militant
 Setsuko Thurlow – hibakusha of Hiroshima at 13 years old, anti-nuclear activist, ambassador and keynote speaker at the reception of the Nobel Peace Prize of ICAN
 Shigeaki Mori – a historian of allied prisoners of war
 Shinoe Shōda – hibakusha at 34 years old, writer and poet
 Shuntaro Hida –hibakusha of Hiroshima at 28 years old, physician specialized in treating hibakusha
 Sunao Tsuboi – hibakusha of Hiroshima at 20 years old, teacher and activist with Japan Confederation of A- and H-Bomb Sufferers Organizations

 Tamiki Hara – hibakusha of Hiroshima at 39 years old, poet, writer and University professor
 Tomotaka Tasaka – hibakusha of Hiroshima at 43 years old, film director and script writer
 Yoko Ota – hibakusha of Hiroshima at 38 years old, writer
 Yoshito Matsushige – hibakusha of Hiroshima at 32 years old, has taken the only 5 pictures known the day of the atomic bombing of Hiroshima
 Shigeru Nakamura – hibakusha of Hiroshima at 34 years old, supercentenarian, oldest living Japanese man (September 9 - November 15, 2022).

Nagasaki
 Joe Kieyoomia – an American Navajo prisoner of war who survived both the Bataan Death March and the Nagasaki bombing
 Kyoko Hayashi – hibakusha of Nagasaki at 14 years old, writer
 Osamu Shimomura – organic chemist and marine biologist; Nobel Prize in Chemistry in 2008
 Sumiteru Taniguchi – hibakusha at 16 years old, known for a picture of him with his back skinless taken by a Marine; anti-nuclear peace activist, president of the council of the A Bomb of Nagasaki, co-president of the Japan Confederation of A- and H-Bomb Sufferers Organizations in 2010
 Takashi Nagai – hibakusha of Nagasaki at 38 years old, doctor and author of The Bells of Nagasaki
 Terumi Tanaka – hibakusha of Nagasaki at 13 years old, engineer and associated professor at the University of Tohoku, activist with Japan Confederation of A- and H-Bomb Sufferers Organizations
 Yōsuke Yamahata – military photographer, not directly victim of the Bomb but has taken pictures of Nagasaki the next day. Died of cancer probably due to radiation. Can be considered as a hibakusha according to the ABCC classification.

Hiroshima and Nagasaki
 Tsutomu Yamaguchi – the first person officially recognized to have survived both the Hiroshima and Nagasaki atomic bombings.

Artistic representations and documentaries

Literature (原爆文学 Genbaku bungaku)

Hibakusha literature
 Summer Flowers (夏の花 Natsu no hana), Tamiki Hara, 1946
 From the Ruins (廃墟から Haikyo kara), Tamiki Hara, 1947
 Prelude to Annihilation (壊滅の序曲 Kaimetsu no jokyoku), Tamiki Hara, 1949
 City of Corpses (屍の街 Shikabane no machi), Yōko Ōta, 1948
 Human Rags (人間襤褸 Ningen Ranru), Yōko Ōta, 1951
 Penitence (さんげ Sange), Shinoe Shōda, 1947 - collection of tanka poems
 Bringing Forth New Life (生ましめんかな Umashimenkana), Sadako Kurihara, 1946
 I, A Hiroshima Witness (私は広島を証言する Watashi wa Hiroshima wo shogen suru), Sadako Kurihara, 1967
 Documents about Hiroshima Twenty-Four Years Later (Dokyumento Hiroshima 24 nen), Sadako Kurihara, 1970
 Ritual of Death (祭りの場 Matsuri no ba), Kyōko Hayashi, 1975
 Poems of the Atomic Bomb (原爆詩集 Genbaku shishu), Sankichi Tōge, 1951
 The bells of Nagasaki (長崎の鐘, Nagasaki no Kane), Takashi Nagai, 1949
 Little boy: stories of days in Hiroshima, Shuntaro Hida, 1984
 Letters from the end of the world : a firsthand account of the bombing of Hiroshima, Toyofumi Ogura, 1997
 The day the sun fell - I was 14 years old in Hiroshima, Hashizume Bun, 2007
 Yoko’s Diary: The Life of a Young Girl in Hiroshima During World War II, Yoko Hosokawa
 Hiroshima Diary, Michihiko Hachiya, 1955
 One year ago Hiroshima (Genshi bakudan kaiko), Hisashi Tohara, 1946

Non-Hibakusha literature
 Hiroshima notes (ヒロシマ・ノート, Hiroshima nôto), Kenzaburô Ooe, 1965
 Black Rain (黒い雨 Kuroi Ame), Masuji Ibuse, 1965
 Hiroshima, Makoto Oda, 1981
 Bakushin (爆心;), Yūichi Seirai, 2007
 Sadako and the Thousand Paper Cranes, Eleanor Coerr, 1977
 Debu Hiroshima ("Ashes of Hiroshima"), Othman Puteh and Abdul Razak Abdul Hamid, 1987
 Burnt Shadows, Kamila Shamsie, 2009
 Nagasaki: Life After Nuclear War, Susan Southard, 2015
 Hiroshima, John Hersey, 1946
 Hibakusha (2015 short story)

Manga and anime
 Barefoot Gen (はだしのゲン Hadashi no Gen), Keiji Nakazawa, 1973-1974, 10 Vol. (also adapted in film in 1976, 1983 and a TV drama in 2007)
 Town of Evening Calm, Country of Cherry Blossoms (夕凪の街 桜の国 Yūnagi no Machi, Sakura no Kuni), Fumiyo Kōno, 2003-2004 (adapted into novel and film in 2007)
 Hibakusha, Steve Nguyen and Choz Belen, 2012
 Bōshi (帽子), Hiroshi Kurosaki, NHK, 2008, 90 mn
In This Corner of the World  (この世界の片隅に, Kono Sekai no Katasumi ni), Masao Maruyama, MAPPA, 2016

Films
 Children of Hiroshima (原爆の子 Genbaku no Ko), Kaneto Shindo, 1952
 Frankenstein Conquers the World (フランケンシュタイン対地底怪獣 Furankenshutain tai Baragon), Ishirō Honda, 1965
 Black Rain (黒い雨 Kuroi Ame), Shohei Imamura, 1989
 The bells of Nagasaki (長崎の鐘, Nagasaki no kane), Hideo Ōba, 1950
 Rhapsody in August (八月の狂詩曲 Hachigatsu no rapusodī (Hachigatsu no kyōshikyoku)), Akira Kurosawa, 1991
 Hiroshima mon amour, Alain Resnais, 1959
 Hiroshima, Koreyoshi Kurahara and Roger Spottiswoode, 1995

Music
 Silent Planet, Darkstrand (Hibakusha), 2013
 Masaru Kawazaki, March forward for peace, 1966
 Krzysztof Penderecki, Threnody to the victims of Hiroshima, 1961
 Masao Ohki, Symphony no 5 "Hiroshima", 1953
 Toshio Hosokawa, Voiceless Voice in Hiroshima, 1989-2001

Fine art painting
 Hiroshima shohenzu (広島生変図 Hiroshima's holocaust), Ikuo Hirayama
 Carl Randall (UK artist who met and painted portraits of Hibakusha in Hiroshima, 2006/09)

Performing arts
 Hibakusha characters are featured in several Japanese plays including The Elephant by Betsuyaku Minoru

Documentaries
 No More Hiroshima, Martin Duckworth, 1984
 Hiroshima: The real History, Lucy van Beek, Brook Lapping Productions 2015
 Hiroshima Witness, Hiroshima Peace Cultural Center and NHK, 1986
 Hiroshima, Paul Wilmshurst, BBC, 2005, 89 mn
 White Light/Black Rain: The Destruction of Hiroshima and Nagasaki, Steven Okazaki, HBO, 2007, 86 mn
 Als die Sonne vom Himmel fiel, Aya Domenig, 2015, 78 min
 Atomic Wounds, Journeyman Pictures, 2008

See also

 Atomic veteran
 Castle Bravo
 Doomsday clock
 Fat Man
 H Bomb
 Hibakujumoku
 Hiroshima Peace memorial park
 Little Boy
 Manhattan project
 Nihon Hidankyo
 Preparatory Commission for the Comprehensive Nuclear-Test-Ban Treaty Organization (CTBTO)
 SCOJ 2005 No.1977
 Treaty on the Prohibition of Nuclear Weapons – Preamble

References

Further reading
 Terkel, Studs, The Good War, Random House:New York, 1984. 
 Hersey, John, Hiroshima, A.A. Knopf: New York, 1985.

External links

 Nagasaki Archive
 White Light/Black Rain official website  (film)
 Voices of the survivors from Hiroshima and Nagasaki
 Voice of Hibakusha "Eye-witness accounts of the bombing of Hiroshima"
 Hibakusha, fifteen years after the bomb (CBC TV news report)
 Virtual Museum "Hibakusha testimonies, coupled with photographs, memoirs and paintings, give a human face to the tragedy of the A-bombing. Starting in 1986, the Hiroshima Peace Culture Foundation initiated a project to record hibakusha giving testimonies on video. In each year since, the testimonies of 50 people have been recorded and edited into 20-minute segments per person"
 The Voice of Hibakusha
 Atomic Bomb Casualty Commission  ABCC
 Radiation Effects Research Foundation website
  "Survival in Nagasaki." 
 "Living with a double A-bomb surviving parent." 
 "Fight against the A-bomb." 
 "Contribute actively to peace." 
 Hibakusha Testimonies – Online reprints of published sources including excerpts from the Japan Times.
 Hibakusha Stories "Initiative of Youth Arts New York in partnership with Peace Boat, the Hiroshima Peace Culture Foundation, the United Nations Office for Disarmament Affairs, and New York Theatre Workshop."
 A-Bomb Survivors: Women Speak Out for Peace – Online DVD Testimonies of Hiroshima and Nagasaki Hibakusha with subtitles in 6 different languages.
Literary Fallout: The legacies of Hiroshima and Nagasaki

 
Nuclear warfare
Atomic bombings of Hiroshima and Nagasaki
Radiation health effects
Japanese people
Anti–nuclear weapons movement